José Valdez is a former American football offensive lineman. He was a member of the Atlanta Falcons, Minnesota Vikings, St. Louis Rams and Saskatchewan Roughriders

External links
Jose Valdez profile - NFL.com
Jose Valdez - University of Arkansas Athletics
Career transactions 

1986 births
Living people
Arkansas Razorbacks football players
Players of American football from Milwaukee
People from Milwaukee County, Wisconsin